Llansamlet railway station is a minor station in Llansamlet, Swansea, south Wales. It is served by local trains operated by Transport for Wales on the South Wales Main Line between Swansea and Cardiff.

Former station

Blocked access steps leading up to the platform can still be seen today on the northern approach to the bridge.

Facilities
The station has two (offset) platforms:
Platform 1, situated east of the Frederick Place overbridge, is for westbound trains towards Swansea
Platform 2, situated west of the bridge, is for eastbound trains towards Cardiff Central

As the station is unmanned, passengers boarding must buy their tickets on the train. There is a free car park for rail passengers. Waiting shelters, timetable poster boards and digital CIS displays are provided on each side. Step-free access is available via ramps to both platforms.

Services 

Journey times are around 10 minutes to Swansea and one hour to Cardiff.

But no trains at present call on a Sunday. A normal service operates on most Bank Holidays.

Notes

External links

Railway stations in Swansea
DfT Category F2 stations
Former Great Western Railway stations
Railway stations in Great Britain opened in 1885
Railway stations in Great Britain closed in 1964
Railway stations in Great Britain opened in 1994
South Wales Main Line
Railway stations served by Transport for Wales Rail